The 2014 Mid-Eastern Athletic Conference men's basketball tournament took place March 10–15, 2014 at the Norfolk Scope in Norfolk, Virginia. 2014 was the second year in Norfolk after the last eight years in Winston-Salem, North Carolina. First round games were played March 10 and March 11, with the quarterfinal games played on March 12 and 13. The semifinals was held March 14, with the championship game on March 15.

Seeds

Bracket

References

2013–14 Mid-Eastern Athletic Conference men's basketball season
MEAC men's basketball tournament
MEAC
Basketball competitions in Norfolk, Virginia
College basketball tournaments in Virginia